Lezoux is a commune in the Puy-de-Dôme department in Auvergne in central France.  It was a key location in the filming of the 2004 film Les Choristes (The Chorus).

Population

See also
Communes of the Puy-de-Dôme department
Lezoux Plate

References

Communes of Puy-de-Dôme
Auvergne